IPTO may refer to:

 Independent Power Transmission Operator, or ADMIE in Greek
 Information Processing Techniques Office
 Insolvency and Public Trustee's Office
 Independent Power Takeoff